Dupont Plaza Hotel may refer to:
 Dupont Plaza Hotel (Miami), a hotel in Miami, Florida, 1957–2004
 Dupont Plaza Hotel arson, 1986
 Hotel Dupont Plaza in San Juan, Puerto Rico, former name of San Juan Marriott Resort & Stellaris Casino

See also
Dupont (disambiguation)